Philemon (Philḗmōn) was an early Christian in Asia Minor who was the recipient of a private letter from Paul of Tarsus. This letter is known as Epistle to Philemon in the New Testament. He is known as a saint by several Christian churches along with his wife Apphia (or Appia). Philemon was a wealthy Christian and a minister (possibly a bishop) of the house church that met in his home.

The Menaia of 22 November speak of Philemon as a holy apostle who, in company with Apphia, Archippus, and Onesimus had been martyred at Colossae during the first general persecution in the reign of Nero. In the list of the Seventy Apostles, attributed to Dorotheus of Tyre, Philemon is described as bishop of Gaza.

Notes

External links
Santiebeati: Saint Philemon

Seventy disciples
1st-century deaths
People in the Pauline epistles
Saints from Roman Anatolia
Christian saints from the New Testament
1st-century bishops in Roman Anatolia
1st-century Romans
Year of birth unknown
People from Colossae
Epistle to Philemon
Slave owners